Günther Engelhart Ziegler (18 January 1933 – 19 December 2013) was a German cyclist. He competed in the tandem sprint at the 1956 Summer Olympics, and finished last after a crash during a repechage round.

Ziegler was a German amateur champion in 1952–1956 in the team time trial. After the 1956 Olympics he turned professional, and in 1961 won the national sprint title, placing second in 1957, 1959–60, 1962, and 1964. He also won the six-day race of Essen in 1960.

References

External links
 

1933 births
2013 deaths
German male cyclists
Olympic cyclists of the United Team of Germany
Cyclists at the 1956 Summer Olympics
Cyclists from Bavaria
People from Schweinfurt (district)
Sportspeople from Lower Franconia